JS Kashima (TV-3508) is a training ship of the Japan Maritime Self-Defense Force (JMSDF). Built to a unique design during the mid-1990s, Kashima is flagship of the JMSDF Training Fleet. The name Kashima comes from the famous Shinto Kashima Shrine in Ibaraki prefecture, located to the northeast of Tokyo.

Development and design 
Kashima is of a unique design referred to as the "Kashima class cadet training ship". Kashima has a full load displacement of 4,050 tons. She is powered by a combined diesel or gas (CODOG) system, which uses two Mitsubishi S16U-MTK diesel engines for cruising, and two Kawasaki-Rolls-Royce Spey SM1C gas turbines (providing 26,150 shaft horsepower each): a diesel and a gas turbine are connected to each of the two controllable-pitch propeller shafts.

The ship is armed with a single Otobreda 76 mm gun and two triple 324 mm torpedo tube sets. Four saluting cannon are also carried. Kashima has a ship's company of 370, including officer cadets. Cadets are accommodated in two-person staterooms, allowing cadets of both sexes to train aboard the ship. The open aft deck was designed for use as a ceremonial and exercise assembly area, but can be used as a temporary helicopter landing zone.

Construction and career
The ship was originally authorised under the Financial Year budget ending in 1991, but construction did not start because of Japan's financial involvement in the Gulf War. The ship was requested again under the 1992 budget, and was approved. Kashima was laid down by the Hitachi Zosen Corporation at the former Maizuru Naval Arsenal shipyards on 20 April 1993. She was launched on 23 February 1994, and commissioned into the JMSDF on 26 January 1995. She is flagship of the JMSDF Training Fleet, and is homeported at Kure.

In July 2000, while visiting New York, Kashima was involved in a minor collision with Queen Elizabeth 2. The collision left a long scratch down the flank of the liner, and a dent in the warship's hull. The Japanese took the incident with good humour, with a Japanese admiral onboard commenting "it was an honour to be kissed by the Queen Elizabeth".

In June 2022, the Kashima made a port call in London as part of an exchange event between Japan and Britain and to commemorate the 120th anniversary of the Anglo-Japanese Alliance in 2022. The ship will participate in an exercise with Britain's Royal Navy.

Gallery

See also
 Kaiwo Maru (1989)

References

External links
 GlobalSecurity.org; JMSDF TV Kashima Class

Ships built by Hitachi Zosen Corporation
1994 ships
Training ships of the Japan Maritime Self-Defense Force